Joshua Bell (c. 1812  24 December 1863) was born in Ireland and immigrated to Canada with his brother and father somewhere between 1815 and 1825.

The father, Alexander, was a shoemaker and the family became successful in that business. After the father's death, the two brothers expanded the business with Joshua taking the lead role. By his death, their company,  J. and T. Bell was one of the larger footwear factories in Montreal. In the 1861, it had  70 employees.

Joshua was important to the economic history of the time in that he was a pioneer of mechanization of shoe production in Canada.

References 

"Papiers de Ludger Duvernay," Canadian Antiquarian and Numismatic Journal (Montreal), 3rd ser., VI (1909), 127–28

Year of birth uncertain
1810s births
1863 deaths
19th-century Canadian businesspeople